This is a list of steamboats that have operated on the Murray-Darling–Murrumbidgee river system. It also includes several diesel-powered vessels built in the same tradition.

See also Murray-Darling steamboat people for more information on people mentioned in this article.

Riverboats

See also
 Murray-Darling steamboat people
 List of Darling River distances
 List of Murray River crossings
 List of Murray River distances
 List of Murrumbidgee River distances
 Murray–Darling basin includes useful chart of tributaries

Notes
1. Spelling : Information in this article has mostly been gleaned from newspaper reports. Barbour, Bower, Christie, Davies, Dickson, Hampson, Hansen, Johnston, Lindqvist, Maultby, Miers, Pickhills, Rossiter, Schmedje, Searles, Tait, Theisz, Westergaard (all prominent people) often appeared in print as Barber, Bowers, Christie, Davis, Dixon, Hampton, Hanson, Johnson, Lindquist, Maltby, Myers, Pickels, Rossitter (or Rosseter), Smidgee (or Schmedge), Searle, Tate, Theiz and Westergard. The firm of Johnson and Davies was spelled four different ways in their own advertisements. Boats were given the same treatment. The barge Tongo was often written "Tonga" and Goldsbrough often "Goldsborough". Although the owners should have known better, the vessel generally named Lady Augusta was actually registered as Lady Agusta and Leichardt was presumably (mis)named for the explorer Ludwig Leichhardt (1813 – c. 1848). The barge Rabbie Burns appears to have metamorphosed into Robbie Burns around 1880. The steamer here spelled "Ferret" may have been registered "Ferrett" – more information is needed. The town now (and here) spelled Narrandera was once mostly "Narandera", a spelling tenaciously retained by its newspaper.

2. Bracketed numbers after some boats' names are intended for clarity and have no meaning outside this article.

3. Dates of service alongside names of boats and their owners and captains are from contemporary newspaper reports, which varied greatly in depth of information supplied. They would therefore not necessarily reflect the vessel or person's full period of service. Dates refer to service on the Murray system; some craft and most skippers had earlier or later service elsewhere.

4. In the interests of simplicity, honorifics (S.S., P.S., M.V. etc.) have been omitted from boat names in the first column.

5. Vessels were frequently modified to take advantage of changing trade requirements; hence burdens, dimensions, etc. quoted may appear inconsistent. Location of the paddles in paddle-wheel boats is a major design consideration: stern-wheelers are faster than side-wheelers and can navigate a narrower passage, but are less manoeuvrable, and are less adapted to towing a barge. Stern-wheelers were not uncommon on the Murray, but unsuited to the bends of the Darling. Boats were occasionally converted from one style to the other. A single central paddle-wheel (as in Gemini) had navigation advantages at the expense of load capacity and convenience, especially in maintaining an even keel. A single rear paddle-wheel, as in Mississippi steamers, proved unpractical.

6. Ownership of vessels was not often reported in the press, which accounts for this column being largely incomplete. The major companies (Wm. McCulloch & Co., Cramsie, Bowden & Co., E. Rich & Co., etc.) as well as owning vessels, also acted as agents for private owners, who may have been their captains, or absentee investors.

7. Almost without exception, no master or vessel was employed on the river throughout the year. In non-drought years shipping activity might be expected to run (give or take a month) from around June (with the winter rains) to December (with the snow melt).

8. "Lower Lakes" here refers to Lakes Alexandrina and Albert, between Goolwa and the Lower Murray. Towns on the Lower Lakes include Milang, Wellington and Meningie

Sources
  Other articles in this series are:
 
 
 
 
 
 
 
 
 
 Phillips, Peter J. Riverboat Ways: Australia's inland paddlewheelers Greenhouse Publications, Richmond, Victoria 1983 
 Mudie, Ian Riverboats, Sun Books, Melbourne 1965

Literature
Newland, Simpson Paving the Way
Brady, E. J. River Rovers
Bedford, Randolph (yet to find)

References

External links
Lake Alexandrina local history wiki

Lists of ships of Australia
Murray-Darling related lists
South Australia-related lists
Paddle steamers of Australia